Daredevil Droopy is a 1951 animated cartoon short, one of the few cartoons in which Droopy was paired with the dog Spike.

Plot
When a circus arrives to town, it features its famous attractions, including "The Great Barko and His Famous Acrobatic Dogs". And under the commercial posters, an advertisement stands, titled "Dare Devil Dog Wanted", advertising a job for Barko's new dog-acrobats, under the condition "Must be Fearless!". This attracts both Droopy and Spike's attention to apply for the job.

Satisfied with the reply from the two dogs, Barko decides to put the situation on the competitive basis: "The one that gives me the best performance in strength and daring, gets the job!", to which the dogs agree. During every tryouts – "see Simpson the Strong Man" test of strength, ringing the bell, "Pop the Balloons" shooting, "See a Woman Sawed in Half", "The Flying Human" flight test with a propeller on the head, riding a car through a solid brick wall, "The Sharp Shooter", juggling, riding on a motorcycle through a ring of fire, flying on the trapeze, tightrope-walking, figure skating and "The Human Bullet" shooting out of the cannon – Spike tries to outperform Droopy and sabotage his performances. He fails every time, and gets himself injured a couple of times.

During Droopy's final act, Spike tries to sabotage his competitor again, by burning his foot with a matchstick. But this leads Droopy to perform faster, leaving the audience to applaud. It also gives Droopy a minor burn on the foot. Impressed with Droopy's successful performances, Barko hires him to be one of his Acrobatic Dogs.  Outraged, Spike chops one of the trapeze poles to bring it down on both Droopy and Barko, but instead, it lands on Spike ("TIM- *crash* -ber."), leaving him the loser.

References

External links
 

1951 animated films
1951 short films
1950s English-language films
Droopy
Films directed by Tex Avery
Metro-Goldwyn-Mayer animated short films
1950s American animated films
1950s animated short films
Films scored by Scott Bradley
Films produced by Fred Quimby
Circus films
Films about competitions
Metro-Goldwyn-Mayer cartoon studio short films
American animated short films
Metro-Goldwyn-Mayer short films
Animated films about dogs